Suhanga Wijewardana (born 20 July 1999) is a Sri Lankan cricketer. He made his Twenty20 debut on 6 January 2020, for Unichela Sports Club in the 2019–20 SLC Twenty20 Tournament. He made his List A debut on 21 November 2021, for Sri Lanka Navy Sports Club in the 2021–22 Major Clubs Limited Over Tournament.

References

External links
 

1999 births
Living people
Sri Lankan cricketers
Sri Lanka Navy Sports Club cricketers
Place of birth missing (living people)